Neil de Silva (born 15 November 1969 on Trinidad) is a retired male track and field athlete from Trinidad and Tobago who specialized in the 200 and 400 metres.

His personal best time over 400 m was 45.02 seconds, achieved during the 1996 Olympics. He holds one national record, in 4 x 400 metres relay together with Patrick Delice, Alvin Daniel and Ian Morris, with 3:01.05 minutes achieved in the heats of the 1992 Summer Olympics.

International competitions

1Disqualified in the semifinals

External links

1969 births
Living people
Trinidad and Tobago male sprinters
Athletes (track and field) at the 1990 Commonwealth Games
Athletes (track and field) at the 1992 Summer Olympics
Athletes (track and field) at the 1994 Commonwealth Games
Athletes (track and field) at the 1996 Summer Olympics
Athletes (track and field) at the 2000 Summer Olympics
Athletes (track and field) at the 1995 Pan American Games
Athletes (track and field) at the 1999 Pan American Games
Olympic athletes of Trinidad and Tobago
Commonwealth Games bronze medallists for Trinidad and Tobago
Commonwealth Games medallists in athletics
Pan American Games medalists in athletics (track and field)
Pan American Games bronze medalists for Trinidad and Tobago
Central American and Caribbean Games silver medalists for Trinidad and Tobago
Competitors at the 1993 Central American and Caribbean Games
World Athletics Indoor Championships medalists
Central American and Caribbean Games medalists in athletics
Medalists at the 1995 Pan American Games
Medallists at the 1994 Commonwealth Games